Tomasz Halicki (born 18 December 1976) is a Polish musician. He has played with such bands as Stygmat, Via Mistica, Diseased and Dead Infection. He currently plays in Abused Majesty, Hermh, Evil Machine and Vader.

Hal is endorsed by Warwick Bass Guitars & Amps

Discography 
Vader
 XXV (2008, Regain Records, guest)
 Go to Hell (EP, 2014, Nuclear Blast)
 Tibi et Igni (2014, Nuclear Blast)
 Future of the Past II – Hell in the East (2015, Witching Hour Productions)
 Before the Age of Chaos – Live 2015 (Live album, 2015, Witching Hour Productions)
 Iron Times (EP, 2016, Nuclear Blast)
 The Empire (2016, Nuclear Blast)
Abused Majesty
 Serpenthrone (2004, Empire Records, Adipocere Records)
 ...So Man Created God in His Own Image (2008, Empire Records 2009, Witching Hour Production)
Hermh
 Before the Eden – Awaiting the Fire (2004, Pagan Records)
 Eden's Fire (2006, Pagan Records, Empire Records)
 After the Fire – Ashes (2008, Witching Hour Productions, Pagan Records)
 The SpiritUal Nation Born (2008, Witching Hour Productions, Pagan Records)
 Cold Blood Messiah (2008, Mystic Production, Regain Records, Witching Hour Productions)
Other
 Asgaard – Stairs to Nowhere (2012, Icaros Records, guest appearance)
 Dead Infection – Corpses of the Universe (2008, Obliteration Records, Haunted Hotel Records, Selfmadegod Records)
 Dead Infection – Heartburn Result (2009, split with Regurgitate, No Posers Please Records)
 Dead Infection – Furniture Obsession (2009, split with Haemorrhage, Fat Ass Records)
 Effect Murder – Architects of Sense (2009, White Worms Records, guest appearance)
 Evil Machine – War in Heaven (2013, Arachnophobia Records)
 Via Mistica – Testamentum (In Hora Mortis Nostre) (2003, Metal Mind Productions)
 Via Mistica – Fallen Angels (2004, Metal Mind Productions, cover art)
 Zørormr – Corpus Hermeticum (2015, Via Nocturna Records, guest appearance)
 Cinis – The Last Days of Ouroboros (2008, Old Temple Records, cover art only)

Equipment 
guitars
 Warwick RB Vampyre 4
 Warwick GPS Thumb Bolt-On 4
 Warwick Vampyre NT 5 custom #16-3083
amps
 Warwick LWA 1000 BLACK
 Warwick LWA 500 BLACK
 Warwick Bass Combo BC 150
 Warwick Bass Cabinets 408 LW CE
effects & others
 Darkglass B7K Ultra
 Darkglass Super Symmetry
 Aquilar Agro
 TC Electronic Sentry Noise Gate

References

External links 

Hal's profile on Facebook

Polish heavy metal guitarists
Living people
1976 births
Death metal musicians
Vader (band) members
Polish lyricists
Polish heavy metal singers
English-language singers from Poland
Polish graphic designers
21st-century Polish male singers
21st-century Polish singers
21st-century guitarists
Polish male guitarists
Artists from Białystok